Kami-Nari Patera is a patera, or a complex crater with scalloped edges, on Jupiter's moon Io. It is named after the Japanese god of rolling thunder, Kami-Nari. Its name was adopted by the International Astronomical Union in 2000. Reiden Patera can be found to the south, and Asha Patera can be found to the east.

References

Surface features of Io (moon)